Thulani Tyson Hlatshwayo (born 18 December 1989) is a South African professional soccer player who plays as a defender for Supersport United and Bafana Bafana.

Career

Ajax Cape Town
Hlatshwayo was born in Soweto, Gauteng. He made his professional debut for Ajax on 5 August 2009 in a 2–1 win against Orlando Pirates, in a quarter-final match of the 2009 MTN 8 tournament at the Coca Cola Park in Johannesburg. He was promoted from the club's youth academy ranks after years of good showing for both the club and the country's national youth teams.

Bidvest Wits
In the early months of 2014 it was announced that 'Tyson' as he is efficiently known has signed a pre-contract with Bidvest Wits. By doing so Hlatshwayo ended speculations that he was heading to Orlando Pirates. He joined the Johannesburg-based club in June. He has since been a force to be reckoned alongside another former Ajax CT player in Thato Mokeke. He started in Bidvest's opening league game against SuperSport United.

International career

Youth teams
Hlatswayo has played for both the South Africa national under-17 and under-20 teams. He was also a member of the South African U-20 team that played in the 2009 FIFA U-20 World Cup, which lost to Ghana in a 2–1 defeat, losing to the eventual champions in the Round of 16 of the tournament.

Senior team
Hlatswayo was included in South Africa's squad for the 2015 Africa Cup of Nations and scored an own goal in the team's opening match as they lost 3–1 to Algeria. On 13 October 2018, he was one of South Africa's goalscorers as the nation recorded its largest ever victory with a 6–0 win over Seychelles in an Africa Cup of Nations qualifier.

Career statistics

International

International goals
Scores and results list South Africa's goal tally first.

Honours

Club
Ajax Cape Town
2009 MTN 8: Finalist
2010 Telkom Knockout: Runners up
Bidvest Wits F.C

Premier Soccer League

° 2016/2017

MTN 8

° 2016

Telkom knockout

2017

Orlando Pirates F.C

MTN 8

° 2020

Notes

References

External links
 

Living people
1989 births
Sportspeople from Soweto
Association football defenders
South African soccer players
Cape Town Spurs F.C. players
Bidvest Wits F.C. players
SuperSport United F.C. players
2011 CAF U-23 Championship players
2015 Africa Cup of Nations players
2019 Africa Cup of Nations players
South Africa international soccer players